Güzelkent is a belde (town) in Türkeli District of Sinop Province, Turkey. The population of the town is 1494 as of 2011. According to old maps, there was a Greek town named Colussa around  Güzelkent Later a Turkish village named Helaldı was founded. After merging with other nearby  villages Heladı was renamed as Güzelkent and was made a seat of township in 1989. The main economic activities of the town are fishing and light industry based on forestry.

References

Populated places in Sinop Province
Towns in Turkey
Türkeli District
Populated coastal places in Turkey